Jonathan Howard is an English actor. He is known for his role on the British TV series Dream Team as Gavin Moody and as Ian Boothby in Thor: The Dark World (2013).

Early and personal life
Howard was born in Lancashire, England and has lived in London since 2005. His daughter with Élodie Yung was born early August 2018.

Career
Howard started acting in 2001 with his first role in educational TV show for youths called Looking After the Penneys as Scott Penney. He was a part of the final cast between 2005 and 2007 of the British TV series Dream Team, playing Gavin Moody, a young footballer. He then went to train at the prestigious London Academy of Music and Dramatic Art (LAMDA) between 2008 and 2011. In 2012, he was in the TV miniseries Titanic as Sixth Officer Moody. He appeared as Sam Thawley, a young, handsome bar patron, on Series 4 of Downton Abbey.

In 2013, he appeared in the zombie war film World War Z with Brad Pitt as one of Camp Humphrey's soldiers and in the Marvel Studios film Thor: The Dark World as Ian Boothby, Darcy's intern and love interest. The following year, he appeared in series 2 of the TV series Mr Selfridge as Ed and in several episodes of the British/American sitcom Episodes.

Filmography

References

External links

Living people
Year of birth missing (living people)
English male television actors
Alumni of the London Academy of Music and Dramatic Art
Male actors from Lancashire
English male film actors